Stefano "Teto" Beltrame (born 8 February 1993) is an Italian professional footballer who plays as an attacking midfielder for Primeira Liga club Marítimo.

Club career

Juventus
Born in Biella, Piedmont region, Beltrame began his youth career with Novara Calcio. He was signed by Juventus F.C. in 2011 in a co-ownership deal, for €750,000, where  in the Primavera (under-19) squad, with whom he graduated the youth academy in June 2013 after helping the club to several youth-team accolades, including the 2013 Coppa Italia Primavera and the 2012 Torneo di Viareggio. During the 2012–13 Serie A season, Beltrame also began to earn a handful of first-team call-ups by head coach, Antonio Conte. Juventus also signed Beltrame outright for an additional fee of €750,000 (half of the registration rights of Alberto Libertazzi plus €300,000).

He made his debut for Juventus on 26 January 2013 against Genoa, coming on as an 82nd-minute substitute for Claudio Marchisio, as the club was searching for a win during a 1–1 draw. Beltrame nearly scored just minutes after his introduction if not for a vital save by Sebastien Frey.

Bari (loan)
On 2 September 2013, Beltrame was signed by Bari on a one-year loan deal from Juventus. In January 2014, however, half of the registration rights of his contract was swapped with 50% registration rights of Vincenzo Fiorillo of Sampdoria. Under the joint ownership agreement between Juventus and Sampdoria, the player's contractual playing rights would be acquired by Sampdoria and the player would remain on loan with Bari for the remainder of the 2013–14 Serie B season. The co-ownership agreement between Juventus and Sampdora was officially renewed on 18 June 2014.

Modena (loan)
On 1 July 2014, Beltrame officially joined Sampdoria upon the conclusion of the loan deal, although he it was soon agreed that he would be joining Serie B side, Modena on another season-long loan deal. However, in winter transfer window of 2015, Beltrame returned to Juventus for €1 million in a -year contract, with Jakub Hromada and Atila Varga moved to Sampdoria for €600,000 and €400,000 respectively.

Pro Vercelli (loan)
In summer 2015 he was signed by Pro Vercelli in a temporary deal. On 1 February 2016 he was signed by Pordenone.

CSKA Sofia
On 27 January 2020, Beltrame signed a permanent deal with Bulgarian club CSKA Sofia, earning a reported €1.5 million per year. He made his official debut on February 15, 2020 in the Eternal Derby against Levski Sofia, starting from the first minute and being substituted 10-minutes before the end. In his second match against Botev Plovdiv on 22 February he scored his first goal for CSKA Sofia securing a 1-0 victory and deservingly being named Man of the Match. He scored his second goal for the club against FC Tsarsko Selo Sofia in a 2-1 defeat.

On December 17, 2020, Beltrame terminated his contract with CSKA Sofia.

Marítmo 
On 15 January 2021, Beltrame signed with Primeira Liga club Marítimo.

International career
Beltrame has represented Italy at the U-18, U-19, and U-20 international levels. He has 7 goals in 19 youth international matches, and has been a key component in Italy's U-19 UEFA Euro qualifiers.

Career statistics

Club

Honours
Juventus
 Coppa Italia Primavera: 2013
 Serie A: 2012–13

References

External links

 

1993 births
Living people
People from Biella
Footballers from Piedmont
Association football forwards
Association football midfielders
Italian footballers
Italy youth international footballers
Juventus F.C. players
S.S.C. Bari players
Modena F.C. players
F.C. Pro Vercelli 1892 players
FC Den Bosch players
Juventus Next Gen players
PFC CSKA Sofia players
Serie A players
Serie B players
Eerste Divisie players
First Professional Football League (Bulgaria) players
Italian expatriate footballers
Expatriate footballers in the Netherlands
Expatriate footballers in Bulgaria
Sportspeople from the Province of Biella